Ernst David may refer to:

 Ernst David (printer) (1864–c. 1918), German typesetter, book printer and musical instrument maker
 Ernst David (soldier) (1920–1943), German soldier in the Wehrmacht during World War II

See also
 Ernst David Bergmann (1903–1975), Israeli nuclear scientist and chemist